Gaziza Akhmetkyzy Zhubanova (Ǵazıza Ahmetqyzy Jubanova;  with middle name "Akhmetovna"; December 2, 1927 – December 13, 1993) was a Soviet and Kazakh composer and pedagogue. People's Artist of the USSR (1981).

Life
Gaziza Zhubanova was born December 2, 1927 in a village in the Jurun District, Aktyubinsk. Zhubanova attended school in Alma-Ata, Kazakhstan, and graduated with honors. She was the daughter of Akhmet Zhubanov, a university educated musician, and grew up in a musical environment.

In 1945 Gaziza Zhubanova began studying at Gnessin State Musical College in Moscow. After completing her studies there, she studied composition with Yuri Shaporin, at the Moscow Conservatoire. After graduating in 1954, she took additional studies in composition and then in 1957 began a career as a composer.

In 1954, she participated in the Seventh Plenary Meeting of the Kazakh Union of Composers. Gaziza Zhubanova has been Chairman of Kazakh Union of Composers, a member of the board of the USSR Union of Composers and Deputy to the Alma-Ata City Soviet. She often works with the Kazakh Song and Dance Company.

Selected works

Gaziza Zhubanova uses subjects and images from the Kazakh history and folklore. She has composed in different forms, including piano, violin, voice, chorus, string quartet and popular songs.

Aksak Kulan (1953–1954), symphonic poem
Booming in the night (1916), opera
Violin Concerto (1957)
Melody (Мелодия) in C minor for viola and piano (1950)
Night Light in the Ural (1957), cantata (words by Khamit Ergaliev)
Incidental music for On the Banks of the Irtysh (play by S. Kusainov)
Ode to the Communist Party
Glory to the Cosmonaut
Embrace
Ye Millions!
Song of Virgin Lands Enthusiasts
The Song Is the Voice of My Heart
The Earth, the Moon and Sputnik, ballet (choreography by V. Vainonen)
Ballade of Mukhtar Auezov, cantata
A Legend of the White Bird, ballet

References

1927 births
1993 deaths
20th-century classical composers
20th-century Kazakhstani musicians
20th-century women composers
People from Mugalzhar District
Communist Party of the Soviet Union members
Moscow Conservatory alumni
People's Artists of the USSR
Recipients of the Order of Friendship of Peoples
Recipients of the Order of the Red Banner of Labour
Ballet composers
Kazakhstani classical composers
Kazakhstani opera composers
Soviet film score composers
Soviet music educators
Soviet opera composers
Soviet women classical composers
Women opera composers